Joseph Percival "Joe" Allen IV (born June 27, 1937) is a former NASA astronaut. He logged more than 3,000 hours flying time in jet aircraft.

Early life and education
Allen was born in Crawfordsville, Indiana, on June 27, 1937. His parents, Mr. and Mrs. Joseph P. Allen III, had resided in Frankfort, Indiana. He attended Mills School, and is a graduate of Crawfordsville High School in Indiana, Class of 1955; received a Bachelor of Arts degree in Mathematics and Physics from DePauw University in 1959, where he was a member of The Delta Chapter of Beta Theta Pi, and a Master of Science and a Doctor of Philosophy degrees in Physics from Yale University in 1961 and 1965, respectively.

Allen is married to the former Bonnie Jo Darling of Elkhart, Indiana. They have two children.

Allen was a research associate in the Nuclear Physics Laboratory at the University of Washington prior to his selection as an astronaut. He was a staff physicist at the Nuclear Structure Laboratory at Yale University in 1965 and 1966, and during the period 1963 to 1967, served as a guest researcher at Brookhaven National Laboratory.

NASA experience
Allen was selected as a scientist-astronaut by NASA in August 1967 as a member of the second group of scientist-astronauts. He completed flight training at Vance Air Force Base, Oklahoma. He served as mission scientist while a member of the astronaut support crew for Apollo 15 and served as a staff consultant on science and technology to the President's Council on International Economic Policy.

From August 1975 to 1978, Allen served as NASA Assistant Administrator for Legislative Affairs in Washington, D.C. Returning to the Johnson Space Center in 1978, as a senior scientist astronaut, Allen was assigned to the Operations Mission Development Group. He served as a support crew member for the first orbital flight test of the Space Shuttle (Columbia) in April 1981 and was the CAPCOM during the reentry phase for this mission. In addition, in 1980 and 1981, he worked as the technical assistant to the director of flight operations.

Space experience

Allen served as mission specialist on STS-5, the first fully operational flight of the Space Shuttle program, which launched from Kennedy Space Center, Florida, on November 11, 1982. He was accompanied by Vance D. Brand (spacecraft commander), Col. Robert F. Overmyer (pilot), and Dr. William B. Lenoir (mission specialist). STS-5, the first mission with four crewmembers, clearly demonstrated the Space Shuttle as fully operational by the successful first deployment of two commercial communications satellites from the Orbiter's payload bay. The mission marked the first use of the Payload Assist Module (PAM-D), and its new ejection system. Numerous flight tests were performed throughout the mission to document Shuttle performance during launch, boost, orbit, atmospheric entry and landing phases. STS-5 was the last flight to carry the Development Flight Instrumentation (DFI) package to support flight testing. A Getaway Special, three Student Involvement Projects, and medical experiments were included on the mission. A planned spacewalk by Allen and Lenoir, the first of the Space Shuttle program, was postponed by one day after Lenoir became ill, and then had to be canceled when the two spacesuits that were to be used developed problems. The STS-5 crew successfully concluded the 5-day orbital flight of Space Shuttle Columbia with the first entry and landing through a cloud deck to a hard-surface runway and demonstrated maximum braking. STS-5 completed 81 orbits of the Earth in 122 hours before landing on a concrete runway at Edwards Air Force Base, California, on November 16, 1982.

Allen was a mission specialist on STS 51-A, which launched from Kennedy Space Center, Florida, on November 8, 1984. He was accompanied by Captain Frederick (Rick) Hauck (spacecraft commander), Captain David M. Walker (pilot), and fellow mission specialists, Dr. Anna Lee Fisher and Commander Dale Gardner. This was the second flight of the Orbiter Discovery.  During the mission the crew deployed two satellites, Canada's Anik D-2 (Telesat H) and Hughes' LEASAT-1 (Syncom IV-1), and operated the 3M Company's Diffusive Mixing of Organic Solutions experiment. In the first space salvage attempt in history, Allen and Gardner performed spacewalks and successfully retrieved for return to Earth the Palapa B-2 and Westar VI communications satellites. STS 51-A completed 127 orbits of the Earth in 192 hours before landing at Kennedy Space Center, Florida, on November 16, 1984. With the completion of this flight Allen logged a total of 314 hours in space.

Post-NASA experience
Allen served as chief executive officer of Space Industries International, Washington, D.C., and later was chairman of Veridian, until he retired in 2004. General Dynamics announced its acquisition of Veridian on June 9, 2003.

In the 1998 HBO miniseries From the Earth to the Moon, Allen was played by Doug McKeon.

In the 1998 movie Armageddon, directed by Michael Bay, Allen served as a NASA consultant and cameoed as "Kennedy Launch" during the launching of the shuttles.

Works
Entering Space: An Astronaut's Odyssey (1985) 

Allen was a contributor to the book NASA's Scientist-Astronauts by David Shayler and Colin Burgess.

Organizations
Allen is a member of several organizations, including the American Physical Society, the American Astronautical Society, the American Institute of Aeronautics and Astronautics, the American Association for the Advancement of Science, Phi Beta Kappa, Beta Theta Pi, Sigma Xi, and Phi Eta Sigma.

Special honors

Fulbright Scholarship (1959–1960)
Outstanding Flying Award, Class 69–06, Vance Air Force Base (1969)
Two NASA Group Achievement Awards (1971 and 1974) in recognition of contributions to the Apollo 15 Lunar Traverse Planning Team and for subsequent work on the Outlook for Space Study Team
Yale Science and Engineering Association Award for Advancement of Basic and Applied Science (1972)
DePauw University Distinguished Alumnus Award (1972)
NASA Exceptional Scientific Achievement Medal (1973)
NASA Exceptional Service Medal (1978)
NASA Superior Performance Award (1975 and 1981)
Honorary Doctor of Science from DePauw University (1983)
Komarov Diploma from the Fédération Aéronautique Internationale

Allen was one of three shuttle astronaut inducted into the U.S. Astronaut Hall of Fame in 2005.

References

Sources
http://science.ksc.nasa.gov/persons/astronauts/a-to-d/AllenJP.txt  (November 1989)

External links
Spacefacts biography of Joseph P. Allen

1937 births
Living people
United States Astronaut Hall of Fame inductees
DePauw University alumni
Yale Graduate School of Arts and Sciences alumni
People from Crawfordsville, Indiana
Crawfordsville High School alumni
NASA civilian astronauts
Space Shuttle program astronauts
Spacewalkers